Streptomyces capillispiralis is a bacterium species from the genus of Streptomyces which was isolated from soil in Sweden. Streptomyces capillispiralis produces 
cephalosporin-C4-carboxymethyl-esterase.

See also 
 List of Streptomyces species

References

Further reading

External links
Type strain of Streptomyces capillispiralis at BacDive – the Bacterial Diversity Metadatabase

capillispiralis
Bacteria described in 1982